Halford Leicestershire Table Sauce, also Halford sauce or Leicestershire sauce, was once a common condiment in the US, akin to catsup or Worcestershire sauce today.

Bottled in England, this sauce was imported to the United States via Boston. It was used in recipes in the same context as Worcestershire sauce. While the company producing it went out of business, because of its previously ubiquitous status in the late 19th century, its bottles are still considered collectable today.

From an article in Donahoe's Magazine, January 1878:

See also
 List of condiments
 List of sauces

References

Sauces